Grant Michael Bovey (born March 1961 in Nottingham, England) is a British businessman and television personality. He is best known for his former marriage to Anthea Turner (a  television presenter).

Career 
Bovey was the CEO of Imagine Homes.

In 2002, Bovey took part in a charity boxing match against Ricky Gervais and lost on points after going three 90 second rounds.

Bovey was declared bankrupt in 2010.

In 2016, Bovey participated in the eighteenth series of Celebrity Big Brother and was the first contestant to be evicted.

Personal life 
Bovey married his first wife, Della Chapman, in 1991, with whom he had three daughters. Bovey was then married to Anthea Turner from 2000 to 2015.

References 

1961 births
Living people
People educated at Carlton le Willows Academy
British businesspeople
Big Brother (British TV series) contestants